The Schwarzwälder Hochwald (literally 'Black Forest High Forest'), not to be confused with the High Black Forest, is the high south-western part of the Hunsrück in the German states of Saarland and Rhineland-Palatinate. The mountains are up to 816.32 m high.

Geography

Location 
The Schwarzwälder Hochwald lies within the Saar-Hunsrück Nature Park, running roughly from Mettlach in the Saarland to the Erbeskopf  in Rhineland-Palatinate. It lies northwest of Losheim, Weiskirchen, Wadern and Nonnweiler in the Saarland and between Hermeskeil and Birkenfeld and between Thalfang and Idar-Oberstein in Rhineland-Palatinate.

North of the Schwarzwälder Hochwald lies the Osburger Hochwald; both forested mountain ranges are known simply as the Hochwald ("High Forest"). The southeastern part of the Schwarzwälder Hochwald is called the Dollberge.

To the northeast of the Schwarzwälder Hochwald is the Idar Forest.

Mountains 

The mountains and hills of the Schwarzwälder Hochwald include the following – sorted by their elevation in metres (m) above sea level (Normalnull unless otherwise stated ):
 Erbeskopf (816.32 m), near Thalfang, highest mountain in the Hunsrück and in Rhineland-Palatinate
 Ruppelstein (762.7 m), near Börfink, county of Birkenfeld, Rhineland-Palatinate
 Sandkopf (757.4 m), near Neuhütten-Muhl, highest mountain in the county of Trier-Saarburg, Rhineland-Palatinate
 Friedrichskopf (707.4 m), near Brücken, Birkenfeld, Rhineland-Palatinate
 Dollberg (695.4 m), between Neuhütten (Rhineland-Palatinate) and Eisen (Saarland), highest mountain of the Saarland; on the border with Rhineland-Palatinate
 Teufelskopf (695.0 m), near Waldweiler, in the Irrwald, Rhineland-Palatinate
 Schimmelkopf (Weiskircher Höhe; 694.8 m), between Mandern (Rhineland-Palatinate) and Weiskirchen (Saarland), second highest mountain of the Saarland; on the border with Rhineland-Palatinate
 Mückenbornberg, near Waldweiler, in the Irrwald, Rhineland-Palatinate

References

External links 
 Literature about the Schwarzwälder Hochwald in the Saarland Bibliography

Rhineland-Palatinate
Natural regions of the Hunsrück